Out of Control may refer to:

Books
 Out of Control (Kevin Kelly book), a 1994 book about technology and economics
 Out of Control (Nancy Drew/Hardy Boys), a 1997 Nancy Drew and Hardy Boys novel
 Out of Control, a 2004 true-crime book by Steven Long about the murder of David Lynn Harris

Film
 Out of Control (1985 film), a film with Sherilyn Fenn
 Out of Control (2002 film), a BBC single drama starring Tamzin Outhwaite
 Out of Control (2003 film), an Indian Hindi film
 Out of Control (2017 film), a German-Chinese thriller film
 Out of Control (1992 film), a film featuring Lesley-Anne Down
 Out of Control (1992 short film), a Disney live-action short
 Out of Control (1998 film), a film starring Tom Conti and Sean Young
 Out of Control (2009 film), a Canadian TV film featuring Laura Vandervoort

Television
 Out of Control (TV series), a 1984 Nickelodeon comedy television series
 Out of Control (TV program), a Filipino docu-reality show 
 "Out of Control" (Law & Order)
 "Out of Control" (Mayday)
 "Out of Control" (That's So Raven)

Music

Albums 
 Out of Control (Anti-Nowhere League album), 2000
 Out of Control (Peter Criss album), 1980
 Out of Control (The Crossfires album), 1963
 Out of Control (Girls Aloud album), 2008
 Out of Control (Ted Nugent album), 1993
 Out of Control: Live from the O2 2009, 2009

Songs 
 "Out of Control" (The Chemical Brothers song), 1999
 "Out of Control" (Hoobastank song), 2003
 "Out of Control" (George Jones song), 1960
 "Out of Control" (Kids in the Kitchen song), 1986
 "Out of Control" (Tuesday Knight song), 1987
 "Out of Control" (Nothing's Carved in Stone song), 2013
 "Out of Control" (Rolling Stones song), 1997
 "Out of Control (Back for More)", by Darude, 2001
 "Out of Control", by the Eagles from Desperado
 "Out of Control", by Praga Khan
 "Out of Control", by Squeeze from Squeeze
 "Out of Control", by U2 from Boy
 "Out of Control", by B'z from Run
 "Out of Control (State of Emotion)", by Keena from Make Sure They See My Face

See also 
 Outta Control (disambiguation)
 Nelson rules, in control theory, identify when a measured variable is out of control